Jonah Osabutey (born 8 October 1998) is a Ghanaian professional footballer who plays as a forward for K.V. Kortrijk.

Career
In the 2018–19 season, Osabutey scored 12 goals and made 2 assists in 27 matches for the Werder Bremen reserves.

In June 2019, he extended his contract with Werder Bremen before joining Belgian First Division A side Royal Excel Mouscron on loan for the 2019–20 season. At Mouscron, Osabutey was voted "player of the season" ahead of teammates Deni Hočko and Jean Butez, having received over 50% of the votes. He had scored five goals and recorded four assists in the regular season. At the start of the 2020–21 season, Osabutey was loaned out again, but now to newly promoted Oud-Heverlee Leuven and with a buy clause.

Osabutey moved to Belgian First Division A club K.V. Kortrijk on 31 August 2021, the last day of the 2021 summer transfer window. He signed a one-year contract with the option of two further years.

References

External links
 

1998 births
Living people
Association football forwards
Ghanaian footballers
3. Liga players
Regionalliga players
Belgian Pro League players
SV Werder Bremen II players
Royal Excel Mouscron players
Oud-Heverlee Leuven players
K.V. Kortrijk players
Ghanaian expatriate footballers
Ghanaian expatriate sportspeople in Germany
Expatriate footballers in Germany
Ghanaian expatriate sportspeople in Belgium
Expatriate footballers in Belgium